Endogalactosaminidase is an enzyme with systematic name galactosaminoglycan glycanohydrolase. This enzyme catalyses the following chemical reaction:

 Endohydrolysis of (1->4)-alpha-D-galactosaminidic linkages in poly(D-galactosamine)

References

External links 
 

EC 3.2.1